Lady Clare is a narrative poem by Alfred Tennyson, first published in 1842.

Textual history 
Lady Clare was first published in 1842. After 1851 no alterations were made.

This poem was suggested by Susan Ferrier's 1824 historical novel The Inheritance. A comparison with the plot of Ferrier's novel will show how Tennyson adapted the tale to his ballad: 

In details Tennyson follows the novel sometimes very closely. Thus the "single rose", the poor dress, and the bitter exclamation about her being "a beggar born", are drawn from the novel.

The 1842 and all editions up to and including 1850 begin with the following stanza and omit stanza 2:—

References

Bibliography 

 Collins, John Churton, ed. (1900). The Early Poems of Alfred, Lord Tennyson. London: Methuen & Co. pp. 253–256. 
 Tennyson, Hallam (1897). Alfred Lord Tennyson: A Memoir by his Son. Vol. 2. London: Macmillan and Co., Limited. p. 377–378.

Further reading 

 Chatfield, Stephanie (8 January 2014). "Tennyson's 'Lady Clare'". Pre-Raphaelite Sisterhood. Retrieved 12 May 2022.
 Ferrier, Susan (1824). The Inheritance. Vol. 1. Vol. 2. Vol. 3. Edinburgh: William Blackwood; London: T. Cadell.

Poetry by Alfred, Lord Tennyson
1842 poems